Fountain Creek Township is one of twenty-six townships in Iroquois County, Illinois, USA.  As of the 2010 census, its population was 368 and it contained 145 housing units.  Fountain Creek Township formed from a portion of Ash Grove Township on September 15, 1868.

Geography
Nearly all of the township consists of flat, open farmland. Two small waterways, Fountain Creek and Whiskey Creek, flow northeast across the township and meet north of Goodwine.

A Union Pacific rail line connecting Chicago and St. Louis runs northeast-to-southwest through the eastern half of the township, and a branch of the defunct Chicago and Eastern Illinois Railroad crosses it near the northern border.

Unincorporated towns
(This list is based on USGS data and may include former settlements.)

Cemeteries
The township contains one cemetery: Old Apostolic, near Fountain Creek.

Demographics

School districts
 Cissna Park Community Unit School District 6
 Hoopeston Area Community Unit School District 11

Political districts
 Illinois' 15th congressional district
 State House District 105
 State Senate District 53

References
 
 United States Census Bureau 2007 TIGER/Line Shapefiles
 United States National Atlas

External links
 City-Data.com
 Illinois State Archives

Townships in Iroquois County, Illinois
Townships in Illinois